Ksenia, Fedor's Beloved Wife is a 1974 Soviet drama film directed by Vitaliy Melnikov.

Plot 
The film tells about the love, complex relationships and human generosity that everyone needs.

Cast 
 Alla Meshcheryakova as Kseniya Ivanova
 Stanislav Lyubshin as Fyodor Petrov
 Lev Durov as Sidorov
 Lyudmila Zaytseva as Valentina
 Vasiliy Merkurev as Personnel Director
 Azat Sherents
 Vladimir Tatosov as Kondratyev
 Lorents Arushanyan as Reporter
 Armen Khostikyan
 Oleg Belov as Worker in a Canteen

References

External links 
 

1974 films
1970s Russian-language films
Soviet drama films
1974 drama films